, also known as  in Japan, is a subsidiary of JVCKenwood that produces and distributes music, movies and other entertainment products such as anime and television shows in Japan. It is known as JVC Entertainment in countries where Sony Music Entertainment operates the RCA Victor label.

History
April 1972:  is spun off as a subsidiary of JVC.
September 30, 1982: JVC Musical Industries, Inc. is founded in the U.S.
January 1990: JVC Musical Industries announces its first video game release will be Boulder Dash.
October 30, 1991: JVC Musical Industries Europe, Ltd. is founded.
April 1993: Nihon AVC and Victor Musical Industries merge and the name is changed to 
October 1, 1996: Victor Interactive Software takes over video game-related activities after Pack-In-Video is merged with Victor Entertainment.
May 1, 1997: JVC Musical Industries is renamed to JVC Music, Inc.
May 14, 1997: JVC Musical Industries Europe is renamed to JVC Music Europe, Ltd.
February 24, 1999: JVC Music, Inc. is dissolved
March 1999: Victor Entertainment's main office is moved.
March 31, 2003: Victor Interactive Software is acquired by Marvelous Entertainment and becomes Marvelous Interactive.  
May 8, 2006: JVC Music Europe is dissolved.
April 2014: Victor Entertainment's corporate name is changed to JVCKenwood Victor Entertainment Corporation.

Labels
Records
AB-Victor France
Aosis Records
CJ Victor Entertainment (joint venture with CJ E&M of South Korea)
Colourful Records
ELA Music (Kaela Kimura's label)
her (SCANDAL's label)
Cypress Showers
Getting Better
Globe Roots
Happy House
Hihirecords (for babies and kids)
Invitation
JVC Entertainment (production, artist managements, and overseas products)
Flying Dog (animation-related products)
FlyingStar Records (formerly BabeStar Label)
rookiestar
JVC Jazz
JVC World Sounds
Mob Squad (Dragon Ash Private Label)
Nafin
Speedstar International
Speedstar Records
Taishita (Southern All Stars Private Label, joint venture with Amuse, Inc.)
Victor
Distribution
3CG Records
AI Entertainment (a division of Mnet Media's FNC Music, co-distributed with Warner Music Japan)
Bad News
D-topia Entertainment
Daipro-X
Marquee, Inc.
Milan Records
RCA Records
Revolver Music
Substance
Teichiku Entertainment (Subsidiary of Victor Entertainment until 2015.)
BAIDIS
Be-tam-ing
Continental
Imperial Records
Imperial International
KIDSDOM (Animation Related Label)
MONAD (Haruomi Hosono Private Label)
Non-Standard(Haruomi Hosono Produce Label)
Overseas Records
PROGRAM (Katsumi Tanaka Private Label ~2000)
TOHO Records (Master Rights Only)
Takumi Note
Teichiku Records
TMC Music
246 Records
Union Records
Union Black Records
WHD Entertainment Inc. (joint venture between WOWOW, Horipro and Disk Garage)

Video
Nelvana
GAGA Communications
MediaNet Pictures
SPO Entertainment
TBS Video

Major artists
Listed alphabetically by group or first name. Names are in Western order (given name, family name).
Nujabes
Atarashii Gakko! (Also under 88rising)
9nine (2009–2010)
Alexandra Stan
Akino Arai (flying DOG)
AKINO from bless4 (flying DOG)
Anthem
Alesha Dixon
ALI PROJECT (flying DOG)
Amorphis
Angra
Batten Showjo Tai (Colourful Records)
The Back Horn
The Bawdies (Victor/Getting Better)
Blessed By A Broken Heart
Buck-Tick (1987–1996; 2016–present under their vanity label Lingua Sounda)
Chanmina (2016–2017) (Warner Music Japan 2018–present)
Chiaki Ishikawa (flying DOG)
CNBLUE (AI Ent./Victor) – left Victor for Warner
Cocco
cymbals
D (CJ Victor)
Daigo☆Stardust
Death from Above 1979 (Japanese distribution rights)
Dew
Doll$Boxx
Dragon Ash (Mob Squad/Victor)
FictionJunction (flying DOG)
FictionJunction YUUKA (flying DOG)
Fear, and Loathing in Las Vegas
Gacharic Spin
Gari
Going Under Ground
Guniw Tools
Hanson (Japan only)
Maia Hirasawa (Japan only)
Leo Ieiri (Colourful Records)
Impellitteri
IVVY
Hiromi Iwasaki
Jero
Junko Sakurada
Kaela Kimura (2013–present)
Kigurumi
Kei (joined "Kigurumi" on November 7, 2007.)
Miki (joined "Kigurumi" on November 7, 2007.)
Rena
Kelly Sweet
Kigurumichiko
Rena (Kigurumi)
Michiko Shimizu
Kiko Loureiro
Kiroro
Kokia
Kyōko Koizumi
Kyūso Nekokami
Leah Dizon
Lisa Komine (flying DOG)
Liv Moon
Lovebites
Love Psychedelico
 Lovely Summer Chan
Lunkhead
Maaya Sakamoto (flying DOG)
MAMAMOO (Japan only)
Mariko Takahashi
Masumi
Matt Bianco
May'n (flying DOG)
Megumi Nakajima (flying DOG)
Merry
Miho Hatori
Mika Arisaka
Miki Matsubara (1987–1989)
Minmi
Miz
Nano (flying DOG)
Noriko Sakai (1987–2009)
Orange Range (2012–, Spice Records/Super Echo Label/Speedstar Records)
ONF (Japan only)
Paris Match
PIG
Pink Lady
Plastic Tree (CJ Victor)
Quruli
Remioromen
Reol
Rimi Natsukawa
ROMEO (Park Jung Min | SS501)
ROUND TABLE featuring Nino (flying DOG)
Rurika Yokoyama (CJ Victor)
Sakanaction
savage genius (flying DOG)
Sayuri Yoshinaga
Scandal (her)
See-Saw (flying DOG)
Sung Si-kyung
Shinichi Mori
Shunsuke Kiyokiba (former EXILE vocalist that was signed under Avex)
SikTh – Japan only
Silent Descent
SMAP
Masahiro Nakai
Kimura Takuya
Goro Inagaki (also goes by &G)
Tsuyoshi Kusanagi
Shingo Katori
Southern All Stars
Steve Barakatt
Supergroupies
Sweet Vacation
Yuko Hara (solo and duet releases with SMAP member Shingo Katori)
Keisuke Kuwata/Kuwata Band
Hiroshi Matsuda
Kazuyuki Sekiguchi
Toy-Box
Traffic Light. (MeseMoa.'s sub-group)
UA
VIXX (CJ Victor)
Wonho (Japan only)
Yoko Kanno (flying DOG)
Yuki Kajiura (flying DOG)
Yukio Hashi
Zardonic
Sambomaster

Video games
Victor Music/Ent.

Victor/JVC Music

JVC Music Europe

See also  
 Subsidiaries of JVC Kenwood
 EF Johnson Technologies – Multi-band portable radio company

Notes

References

External links
 Victor Entertainment

 
Anime companies
Mass media companies based in Tokyo
IFPI members
Japanese record labels
Mass media companies established in 1972
JVCKenwood
1972 establishments in Japan